The Church of St John the Evangelist is a church in Ryhall, Rutland. It is a Grade I listed building.

History

The church dates from the early 13th century. Several carved figures are positioned around the outside of the church. The south porch has a parvis room, which would have been made for the priest.

St Tibba is said to have lived in the village in the 7th century. She was buried in the church but her relics were removed to Peterborough Abbey by Abbot Ælfsige.  The remains of a small hermitage associated with the saint can be seen on the west side of the north aisle of church.

References

Ryhall
Ryhall